The Materassi Sisters (Italian: Sorelle Materassi) is a 1944 Italian comedy film directed by Ferdinando Maria Poggioli and starring Emma Gramatica, Irma Gramatica and Olga Solbelli. The film is an adaptation of the 1934 novel of the same title by Aldo Palazzeschi. It was shot at the Cinecittà Studios in Rome.

Cast

References

Bibliography 
 Reich, Jacqueline & Garofalo, Piero. Re-viewing Fascism: Italian Cinema, 1922-1943. Indiana University Press, 2002.

External links 

1944 films
Italian comedy films
1944 comedy films
1940s Italian-language films
Films directed by Ferdinando Maria Poggioli
Films based on Italian novels
Italian black-and-white films
Films shot at Cinecittà Studios
Films scored by Enzo Masetti
1940s Italian films